Thordi is a village / panchayat located in the Gir Gadhada Taluka of Gir Somnath district in Gujarat State, India. Earlier, until August 2013, Thordi was part of Una Taluka and Junagadh district. The latitude 20.973820 and longitude 70.833509 are the geo-coordinate of the Village Thordi. Gandhinagar is the state capital of Thordi village which is located around 400 kilometres away from Thordi.

According to Census 2011, with the 303 families, the population of this village is 1670. Out of this, 830 are males and 840 are females. Most residents are dependent on agriculture.

Demographics 
According to the 2011 census of India, Thordi has 303 households. The effective literacy rate (i.e. the literacy rate of population excluding children aged 6 and below) is 69.74%.

List of villages in Gir Gadhada taluka
Villages: Revenue records list forty-three villages for Gir Gadhada Taluka.

Ambavad
Ankolali
Babariya
Bediya
Bhakha
Bhiyal
Bodidar
Dhokadva
Dhrabavad
Dron
Fareda
Fatsar
Fulka
Gir Gadhada
 Harmadiya
Itvaya
Jamvala
Janjariya
Jaragli
Jhudvadli
Juna Ugla
Kanakiya
Kaneri
Kansariya
Khilavad
Kodiya
Mahobatpara
Motisar
Nagadiya
Nitli
Panderi
Rasulpara
Sanosri
Sanvav
Sonariya
Sonpura
Thordi
Ugla
Umedpara
Undarari
Vadli
Vadviyala
Velakot

Notable people 
Tapomurti Sadguru Shastri Shri Narayanprasaddasji Swami (Girdhar Radadiya) was a  well known Sadhu/Swami of Swaminarayan Sampraday who had belonged to the  village. Currently, Nagjibhai Radadiya (Swami's nephew) and his family are living in this village.

References 

Villages in Gir Gadhada Taluka
Villages in Gir Somnath district